GW-803430 (GW-3430) is a drug used in scientific research and is a selective non-peptide antagonist at the melanin concentrating hormone receptor MCH1. In animal studies it has anxiolytic, antidepressant and anorectic effects.

References 

Antidepressants
Anxiolytics
Anorectics
Pyrrolidines
Phenol ethers
Lactams
Chloroarenes